NASCAR Thunder was a retail chain of NASCAR collectables (die-cast toys and clothing). The chain was owned and operated by the MTV Networks subsidiary of Viacom and had 11 stores throughout the Southeastern and Southwestern United States.

NASCAR Thunder opened in May 1996 as a subsidiary of The Nashville Network (TNN), then a subsidiary of Gaylord Entertainment Company. The first store was located at the Gwinnett Place Mall in Duluth, Georgia, a suburb of Atlanta. Over the years, the chain opened more stores, including another location in Atlanta, along with additional stores in Winston-Salem, North Carolina, Knoxville, Tennessee, Jacksonville, Florida, Dallas, Texas and several other cities. Some stores also had meet and greets with several NASCAR drivers, including Darrell Waltrip, Richard Petty, and his son Kyle Petty, among others.

In 2000, CBS, which bought TNN three years prior, merged with Viacom, who announced on February 21, 2001, that it would close all 11 of its stores, citing an economic downturn as well as the company declaring the chain not profitable. The announcement came just three days after the death of NASCAR legend Dale Earnhardt during a crash at the 2001 Daytona 500 and three months after TNN and CBS lost the broadcast rights to NASCAR.

References

Retail companies established in 1996
Retail companies disestablished in 2001
1996 establishments in Georgia (U.S. state)
2001 disestablishments in Georgia (U.S. state)
Duluth, Georgia
Paramount Media Networks